This is a summary of the year 2014 in the Canadian music industry.

Events 
March 23 – Arcade Fire's video for "Afterlife", directed by Emily Kai Bock, wins the 2014 Prism Prize.
March 30 – Juno Awards of 2014
April – 2014 East Coast Music Awards
June 19 – Prelimimary longlist for the 2014 Polaris Music Prize is announced.
July 15 – Shortlist for the Polaris Music Prize is announced.
September 22 – Tanya Tagaq wins the Polaris Music Prize for her album Animism.
November 29 – 10th Canadian Folk Music Awards

Bands on hiatus 
Hedley
Crystal Castles

Bands reformed 
Stereos
The Smalls

Albums released

A 
Alvvays, Alvvays – July 22
Matt Andersen, Weightless – January 28
Jann Arden, Everything Almost – April 29
Arkells, High Noon – August 5
Rich Aucoin, Ephemeral – September 9
Austra, Habitat (EP) – June 17
Ayrad, Ayrad – October 28

B 
Philippe B, Ornithologie, la nuit – April
BadBadNotGood, III – May 6
Bahamas, Bahamas Is Afie – August 19
Del Barber, Prairieography – February 4
Jill Barber, Fool's Gold – June 17
Matthew Barber, Big Romance – May 27
The Barr Brothers, Sleeping Operator – October 7
Barzin, To Live Alone in That Long Summer – February 24
Bobby Bazini, Where I Belong – May 10
 The Beaches, Heights
Bend Sinister, Animals – March 11
Ridley Bent, Wildcard
Art Bergmann, Songs for the Underclass – August 26
Bidiniband, The Motherland – May 29
Big Wreck, Ghosts – June 10
Billy Talent, Hits – November 4
The Birthday Massacre, Superstition – November 11
Blackie and the Rodeo Kings, South – January 14
Blue Rodeo, A Merrie Christmas to You – November 4
Isabelle Boulay, Merci Serge Reggiani
Philippe Brach, La foire et l'ordre
Buck 65, Neverlove – September 30
Buck 65 with Jorun Bombay, Laundromat Boogie – September 29
Spencer Burton, Don't Let the World See Your Love
Matthew Byrne, Hearts and Heroes

C 
Steph Cameron, Sad-Eyed Lonesome Lady
Paul Cargnello, The Hardest Part Is You May Never Know
Caribou, Our Love – October 7
Jennifer Castle, Pink City – September 2
 Chic Gamine, Christmas, Vol. 1
Chromeo, White Women – April
Cœur de pirate, Trauma: Chansons de la serie tele Saison 5 – January 14
Adam Cohen, We Go Home – September 16
Leonard Cohen, Popular Problems – September 23
Cold Specks, Neuroplasticity – August 26
Antoine Corriveau, Les Ombres longues
Cousins, The Halls of Wickwire – May 13
Rose Cousins, Stray Birds – September 2
Amelia Curran, They Promised You Mercy – November 4

D 
Danko Jones, Garage Rock – April 8
deadmau5, (1<2) – June 17
Death From Above 1979 – The Physical World – September 9
Tony Dekker, Sings 10 Years of Zunior – August 5
Mac DeMarco, Salad Days – April 1
Devours, 24th & Main
Digging Roots, For the Light
Celine Dion, Céline une seule fois / Live 2013 – May 16
Dirty Beaches, Stateless – November 4
Down With Webster, Party For Your Life – January 28
Gordon Downie and The Sadies, And the Conquering Sun – April 15
Kevin Drew, Darlings – March 18
Victoria Duffield, Accelerate – June 3
Durham County Poets, Chikkaboodah Stew

E 
Eccodek, Singing in Tongues
Elephant Stone, The Three Poisons – August 26
Elliott Brood, Work and Love – October 21
Quique Escamilla, 500 Years of Night

F 
Christine Fellows, Burning Daylight – September 23
Michael Feuerstack, Singer Songer – April 29
Serge Fiori, Serge Fiori – March 11
Jeremy Fisher, The Lemon Squeeze – May 13
Frazey Ford, Indian Ocean – October 14
Fucked Up, Glass Boys – June 3

G 
Gob, Apt. 13 – August 26
Jenn Grant, Clairvoyant – May 9
Jenn Grant, Compostela – October 21
Emm Gryner, Torrential – April 8

H 
Kevin Hearn, Days in Frames – November 25
Ryan Hemsworth, Alone for the First Time – November 4
Hey Rosetta!, Second Sight – October 21
The Hidden Cameras, Age – January 21
Matt Holubowski, Ogen, Old Man

I 
In-Flight Safety, Conversationalist – September 9

J 
jacksoul, Greatest Hits – November 25
Junia-T, Eye See You

K 
Mo Kenney, In My Dreams
Kiesza, Sound of a Woman – October 21
Diana Krall, Wallflower – September 9
Nicholas Krgovich, On Sunset
Kyprios, Midnight Sun

L 
Lisa LeBlanc, Highways, Heartaches and Time Well Wasted – November 4
Salomé Leclerc, 27 fois l'aurore
Library Voices, For John
Lights, Little Machines – September 23
Lowell, I Killed Sara V – February
Lowell, We Loved Her Dearly – September

M 
Madchild, Switched On
Magic!, Don't Kill the Magic – July 1
Jay Malinowski & the Deadcoast, Martel – February 11
Marie-Mai, M – May 12
John Mann, The Waiting Room
Kalle Mattson, Someday, The Moon Will Be Gold – February 11
Eamon McGrath, Exile, Part 2 – March 11
Sarah McLachlan, Shine On – May 6
The Meligrove Band, Bones of Things – November 18
Patrice Michaud, Le Feu de chaque jour
Millimetrik, Lonely Lights (LP), Remixed Lights (EP)
Moist, Glory Under Dangerous Skies – October 7
Monogrenade, Composite – February 4
Mother Mother, Very Good Bad Thing – November 4
Mounties, Thrash Rock Legacy – March 4
Miranda Mulholland, Whipping Boy

N 
The New Mendicants, Into the Lime – January 28
The New Pornographers, Brill Bruisers – August 26
Justin Nozuka, Ulysees – April 15
NQ Arbuckle, The Future Happens Anyway – April 29

O 
The OBGMs, The OBGMs
Oh Susanna, Namedropper – October 7
Old Man Luedecke, I Never Sang Before I Met You – February 4
The Olympic Symphonium, Chance to Fate – March 18
Orange O'Clock, Crazy Carnival

P 
The Pack A.D., Do Not Engage – January 28
Owen Pallett, In Conflict – May 13
Pascale Picard Band, All Things Pass – April 18
Philémon Cimon, L'Été
Pink Mountaintops, Get Back – April 29
Dany Placard, Santa Maria
The Provincial Archive, It's All Shaken Wonder
PS I Love You, For Those Who Stay – July 22

R 
Radio Radio, Ej feel zoo – March 18
Raised By Swans, Öxnadalur – November 1
Alyssa Reid, Timebomb – February 11
Reuben and the Dark, Funeral Sky
Alejandra Ribera, La Boca – February 4
The Road Hammers, Wheels – June 1
Sam Roberts Band, Lo-Fantasy – February 11
The Rural Alberta Advantage, Mended with Gold – September 30
Rush, R40 – November 11
Justin Rutledge, Daredevil – April 22

S 
Julien Sagot, Valse 333
Sargeant X Comrade, Salvage the Soul
Saukrates, Amani – September 23
Crystal Shawanda, The Whole World's Got the Blues
Skinny Puppy, The Greater Wrong of the Right (reissue) – January 28
Sloan, Commonwealth – September 9
Dallas Smith, Lifted - November 25
Dallas Smith, Tippin' Point (EP) – March 4
Meaghan Smith, Have a Heart
Solvent, New Ways: Music from "I Dream of Wires" – February 11
The Stanfields, For King and Country
Stars, No One Is Lost – October 14
Sunparlour Players, The Living Proof – April 8
Swollen Members, Brand New Day – June 17

T 
Tanya Tagaq, Animism – May 27
The Tea Party, The Ocean at the End – June 24
Thee Silver Mt. Zion Memorial Orchestra, Fuck Off Get Free We Pour Light on Everything – January 21
Theory of a Deadman, Savages – July 29
Thus Owls, Turning Rocks – April 8
Timber Timbre, Hot Dreams – April 1
Tokyo Police Club, Forcefield – March 25
The Tragically Hip, Fully Completely (reissue) – November 17
The Trews, The Trews – April 22

U 
Ubiquitous Synergy Seeker, Advanced Basics – February 11
Un Blonde, Tenet

V 
Rosie Valland, Rosie Valland
Chad VanGaalen, Shrink Dust – April 29
Various Artists, Native North America, Vol. 1 – November 25
Roch Voisine, My Very Best – February 11

W 
Rufus Wainwright, Vibrate: The Best of Rufus Wainwright – March 4
Wake Owl, The Private World of Paradise – March 4
Weaves, Weaves EP
Bry Webb, Free Will – May 20
The Wet Secrets, Free Candy – February 4
Whitehorse, Éphémère sans repère – April 1
WHOOP-Szo, Qallunaat/Odemin
Royal Wood, The Burning Bright – March 4
The Wooden Sky, Let's Be Ready – September 2

Y 
Nikki Yanofsky, Little Secret – May 6
You+Me, rose ave. – October 14
Neil Young, A Letter Home – April 19

Z 
Zeus, Classic Zeus – September 2

Top hits on record 
The lists are updated weekly through Nielsen Soundscan.

Albums

Top 10 Canadian albums

Top 10 International albums

Singles

Top 10 Singles

Canadian Hot 100 Year-End List

Deaths 
 February 25 – Angèle Arsenault, singer-songwriter
 February 26 – Georges Hamel, country music singer and songwriter
 March 23 – Dave Brockie, heavy metal singer (Gwar)
 March 25 – Bill Merritt, rock bassist and festival director, director of the Winnipeg Folk Festival, co-founder of the Winnipeg International Children's Festival
 March 29 – Dave Gregg, punk guitarist (D.O.A.)
May 10 – Nash the Slash (Jeff Plewman), progressive rock musician

References